"Smile Like You Mean It" is a song by American rock band the Killers, written by lead vocalist Brandon Flowers and bassist Mark Stoermer. Originally released as a B-side of "Mr. Brightside" in September 2003, it is featured on their debut studio album Hot Fuss (2004). It was the third single from the album released in the United States and the fourth in the United Kingdom, reaching number 15 on the Billboard U.S. Modern Rock Tracks chart and number 11 on the UK Singles Chart. It also received substantial radio airplay in Australia, where it was ranked number 39 on Triple J's Hottest 100 of 2004.

Critical reception
Billboard said the song "seems to deal with coming to terms with growing up and getting older." Chuck Arnold with People magazine called the song "a sardonic moper worthy of the Smiths." Billboard said the single is "more restrained and downtempo compared with the band's previous hits" but otherwise "pretty upbeat and is awash with soaring new wave synthesizers and 'killer' guitars." In the UK, the song was voted at 91 on Absolute Radio's 100 Best Songs of the Decade. Paste and American Songwriter both ranked the song number seven on their lists of the greatest Killers songs.

Covers and other information
The Killers claim that the song was written in just eight minutes. According to Brandon Flowers, the lyric "Looking back at sunsets on the East side" refers to the East side of Las Vegas, Nevada.

David Gray performed an acoustic version of "Smile Like You Mean It" on BBC's Radio 1 in the Live Lounge. Tally Hall covered the song for the sixth The O.C. soundtrack: Music from the OC: Mix 6.

The song was released as a downloadable track for the music video game series Rock Band on November 25, 2008.

"Smile Like You Mean It" was remixed by French music producer Madeon.

Music video
The music video for the song shows ghostly figures of the band wandering around a house that the characters of the song presumably used to live in. While Flowers sings to the camera, flashbacks of the old house are shown behind him, including a children's party, a Christmas morning, a high school party, and a funeral. While these extras are oblivious to being watched, at the end they turn to the camera to look at the viewer while the band fades away.

Track listing

UK 7-inch red vinyl single
A. "Smile Like You Mean It"
B. "Ruby, Don't Take Your Love to Town" 

UK CD single
 "Smile Like You Mean It"
 "Get Trashed"

UK 12-inch single
 "Smile Like You Mean It" 
 "Mr Brightside" 

UK digital single
 "Smile Like You Mean It"  – 6:26
 "Smile Like You Mean It"  – 7:34
 "Get Trashed" – 3:39

Australian CD single
 "Smile Like You Mean It"
 "Change Your Mind"
 "Mr Brightside"

Charts

Weekly charts

Year-end charts

Certifications

Release history

References

External links
MusicOMH Song Review

The Killers songs
2005 singles
Songs written by Brandon Flowers
Songs written by Mark Stoermer